The Hinton St Mary Mosaic is a large, almost complete Roman mosaic discovered at Hinton St Mary, Dorset, England in 1963. It appears to feature a portrait bust of Jesus Christ as its central motif, which could be the oldest depiction of Jesus Christ anywhere in the Roman Empire. A second mosaic was found during 2022 excavations on the site. The mosaic found in 1963 was chosen as Object 44 in the BBC Radio 4 programme A History of the World in 100 Objects, presented by British Museum director Neil MacGregor.

The mosaic covered two rooms, joined by a small decorated threshold. It is largely red, yellow and cream in colouring. On stylistic grounds it has been dated to the 4th century and is attributed to the mosaic workshop of Durnovaria (modern Dorchester). It is currently in storage at the British Museum, although the central medallion is on display there.

Christian panel

A central circle surrounds a portrait bust of a man in a white pallium standing before a Christian chi-rho symbol flanked by two pomegranates. He is generally identified as Christ, although the Emperor Constantine I has also been suggested despite the absence of any insignia or identifiers pointing to a particular emperor other than the chi-rho. On each side of this are four lunettes, each featuring conventional forest and hunting vignettes, mostly of a dog and a deer. In the corners are four quarter circles containing portrait busts, either representing the winds or the seasons.

Pagan panel
It consists of a central circle containing an image of characters from Roman mythology, Bellerophon killing the Chimera. This has been interpreted in a more Christian context as representing good defeating evil. Flanking this are two rectangular panels again featuring dogs hunting deer.

Context
The mosaic was discovered on 12 September 1963 by the local blacksmith, Walter John White. It was cleared by the Dorset County Museum with help from local people and lifted for preservation by the British Museum,. It was assumed to have been a villa, and the layout of the mosaic room resembles a Roman triclinium, or dining room. However, after excavations in 2021 and 2022 it is no longer thought to be part of a villa.

Destruction
In 2000, a new roof was erected by architects Foster and Partners to cover the previously open courtyard of the British Museum. As part of this major building work it was decided that the Hinton St Mary mosaic should be moved.

The previously intact mosaic, which was fixed to the museum floor, was levered up and broken into pieces by Museum staff in 1997.  Chris Smith, the former Director of ‘Art Pavements’ which moved the mosaic from Dorset, was described as “outraged at what he saw as an act of vandalism and stated that it was completely unnecessary as moving the mosaic was quite feasible without damage.”

The pieces are now stored in boxes in the museum vaults with only the central Christian portrait on display in the Gallery.

The Association for the Study and Preservation of Roman Mosaics protested at the destruction and decision to only display part of the mosaic. They launched a petition stating that “the mosaic possibly contains the only known representation of Christ in an ancient pavement, it is of unique importance not just in Britain but in the context of the Roman Empire as a whole, and merits being displayed in its entirety. It is insufficient to show the central roundel in isolation, however important. The full meaning of the pavement can be appreciated only if the whole of it is visible, including the accompanying heads and figure scenes”.

The Association for the Study and Preservation of Roman Mosaics also produced a factsheet with an explanation of the design of the entire intact mosaic.

Renewed excavations from 2021 onwards
The British Museum asked Dr Peter Guest of Vianova Archaeology to renew excavations in Hinton St Mary in 2021 and 2022 Dr Guest involved local people extensively in the excavations, and wrote in village magazine The Mosaic that the excavations were "a resounding success." Dr Guest also commented that "we are now thinking about organising a 3rd season next year [2023] to find answers to those questions that still remain about Roman Hinton St Mary and to tie up any final loose ends!"

Possible partial return to Dorset
On 2 August 2019, Hinton St Mary villagers and the Chair of the Dorset Unitary Authority were told at a closed-door meeting with the British Museum that the mosaic would be partially returned to the Dorset County Museum. However, the head of Christ would not be returned, as the original would be “loaned to museums worldwide”. A replica would be given to the Dorset County Museum.

No answer was given to one attendee's question that: “Given that she [a British Museum curator] boasted the fact that the replicas they made were indistinguishable from the originals, surely it would make more sense to send the replica around the world and keep the original safe in Dorset?”

It is not clear whether the complete mosaic or only a part of it will be displayed in Dorset County Museum.

In July 2022 the Blackmore Vale newspaper reported that "discussions are at an advanced stage with a view to bringing the important Roman artefact to the Dorset County Museum in Dorchester or another site."

The Sturminster Newton Museum (around 2 miles or 3 kilometres south of Hinton St Mary) has a display about the mosaic, its finding and planned return, and the local area in Roman times.

References

Further reading
Neal, D. S. (1981). Roman Mosaics in Britain.
  
Smith, D. J. (1969). 'The Mosaic Pavements' in Rivet, A. L. F. The Roman Villa in Britain.

External links
Vianova Archaeology Hinton St Mary webspages
British Museum page
BBC A History of the World in 100 Objects page
The Association for the Study and Preservation of Roman Mosaics

Christianity in Roman Britain
Romano-British objects in the British Museum
History of Dorset
Roman sites in Dorset
Roman religious sites in England
Christian buildings and structures in the Roman Empire
Archaeological sites in Dorset
Roman mosaics